Khasanovo (Xäsän) is a rural locality (a village) in Urshaksky Selsoviet, Aurgazinsky District, Bashkortostan, Russia. The population was 13 as of 2010. There is 1 street.

Geography 
Khasanovo is located 44 km northwest of Tolbazy (the district's administrative centre) by road. Chulpan is the nearest rural locality.

References 

Rural localities in Aurgazinsky District